John Marshall Harlan High School  may refer to:
 Harlan Community Academy High School - Chicago
 John Marshall Harlan High School - Unincorporated Bexar County, Texas, near San Antonio

See also
 Harlan County High School, Rosspoint, Kentucky